Nasser Military Academy (Nasser Academy for Military Science) or Nasser Higher Military Academy (NHMA) is a higher military academy inaugurated in March 1965 after a republican decree was issued.

It had 1,053 graduates of other countries, such as: Algeria, Sudan, UAE, Pakistan ,Syria, Iraq, Kuwait, Saudi Arabia, Greece, the Netherlands, Germany and Turkey.

References 

Nasser Academy Official Website

Military academies of Egypt
1965 establishments in Egypt
Educational institutions established in 1965